Hässelby is a Swedish town that is a part of Hässelby-Vällingby in the city of Stockholm, Sweden, comprising the suburban areas Hässelby Gård, Hässelby Strand and Hässelby Villastad. The territory also corresponds to Hässelby parish in the Church of Sweden. Hässelby SK is the town's local sports club.

Hässelby - novel by Johan Harstad 
Hässelby is a novel by the Norwegian author, Johan Harstad, published in 2007. The main part of the novel takes place in the suburb of Hässelby, and focuses on the Swedish children's book character, Alfie Atkins, as an adult. In this novel, strongly influenced by David Lynch's Twin Peaks, the world comes to an end, starting in Hässelby.

References 

Districts of Stockholm
Metropolitan Stockholm